Daniel Florea (born 18 December 1975 in Vaslui) is a Romanian football coach and former player.

International career
Daniel Florea played 3 matches for Romania, making his debut under coach Victor Pițurcă when he came as a substitute and replaced Dumitru Mitriță in the 88th minute of a friendly which ended with a 2–0 victory against Estonia. His second game for the national team was a 1–0 away victory against Azerbaijan at the Euro 2000 qualifiers. His last match for Romania was a friendly which ended with a 1–0 loss against Greece.

International stats

Honours

Player
Dinamo București
Liga I (1): 1999–00
Cupa României (2): 1999–00, 2000–01
Shakhtar Donetsk
Ukrainian Premier League (1): 2001–02
Ukrainian Cup (2): 2001–02, 2003–04
APOEL
Cypriot First Division (2): 2006–07, 2008–09
Cypriot Cup (1): 2007–08
Cypriot Super Cup (1): 2008

References

External links

Profile at FFU website

1975 births
Living people
Sportspeople from Vaslui
Romanian footballers
Association football defenders
ASC Oțelul Galați players
FC Dinamo București players
FC Shakhtar Donetsk players
FC Metalurh Zaporizhzhia players
FC Metalurh Donetsk players
APOEL FC players
FCM Dunărea Galați players
Liga I players
Liga II players
Ukrainian Premier League players
Cypriot First Division players
Romanian expatriate footballers
Expatriate footballers in Ukraine
Romanian expatriate sportspeople in Ukraine
Expatriate footballers in Cyprus
Romanian expatriate sportspeople in Cyprus
Romania international footballers
Romanian football managers
ASC Oțelul Galați managers